National Route 34 is a national highway in South Korea connects Dangjin to Yeongdeok. It established on 31 August 1971.

Main stopovers
South Chungcheong Province
 Dangjin - Asan - Seobuk District (Cheonan)
Gyeonggi Province
 Anseong
North Chungcheong Province
 Jincheon County - Jeungpyeong County - Goesan County
North Gyeongsang Province
 Mungyeong - Yecheon County - Andong - Cheongsong County - Yeongdeok County

Major intersections

 (■): Motorway
IS: Intersection, IC: Interchange

South Chungcheong Province

North Chungcheong Province

North Gyeongsang Province

References

34
Roads in South Chungcheong
Roads in Gyeonggi
Roads in North Chungcheong
Roads in North Gyeongsang